Robert Biddulph  (3 March 1801 – 28 February 1864) was a British Whig Member of Parliament.

Family
Biddulph was the son of John Biddulph, of Ledbury, Herefordshire, and his wife Augusta (née Roberts). He married Elizabeth, daughter of George Palmer, of Nazeing Park, Essex, in 1830.

 Their elder son, Michael, was a banker and politician and was elevated to the peerage as Baron Biddulph in 1903. 
 Second son, Sir Robert, became a General in the Army.
 Third son, Colonel John Biddulph, served in India and published several works.
 Fifth and youngest son, George Tournay Biddulph (25 May 1844 – 1929), also worked for the family banking firm; Cocks Biddulph & Co. and between 1867 and 1907 was treasurer to the House of Charity, Soho, and organiser and then treasurer of Church House, Westminster.

On 3 October 1883 George married his second cousin, Lady Sarah Wilfreda Palmer, daughter of Earl Selbourne and they lived at Douglas House, Petersham.

Career
Robert Biddulph sat as Member of Parliament for Hereford between 1832 and 1837 and also served as a Justice of the Peace and Deputy Lieutenant of Herefordshire.

Later life
Robert Biddulph died in February 1864, aged 62. His wife survived him by 35 years died in January 1899.

References

External links 
 

1801 births
1864 deaths
People from Ledbury
Deputy Lieutenants of Herefordshire
English justices of the peace
Politics of Herefordshire
Whig (British political party) MPs for English constituencies
Members of the Parliament of the United Kingdom for English constituencies
UK MPs 1832–1835
UK MPs 1835–1837